The Southern Andean steppe is a montane grasslands and shrublands ecoregion occurring along the border of Chile and Argentina in the high elevations of the southern Andes mountain range.

Setting
At higher elevations are found permanent snow, glaciers, and ice fields. At lower elevations, this ecoregion grades into Chilean matorral and Valdivian temperate forests to the west and High Monte to the east. To the north it transitions to the Central Andean dry puna and to the south the Patagonian steppe.

Climate
This ecoregion has a cold desert climate, Köppen climate classification BWk. Precipitation falls mainly in winter.

Flora
The flora of this ecoregion is adapted to its cold, dry, and windy climate. Many of the plant genera have evolved endemic species.

The plants on the western side of this ecoregion can be divided into three zones based on their growth forms and elevation. In the lower elevations, grow large shrubs 
such as Chuquiraga oppositifolia and Nassauvia axillaris. In intermediate elevations, grow small shrubs, tussock grasses, and cushions. These include Azorella madreporica, Laretia acaulis, and Stipa spp.

The plants on the eastern side do not grow in distinct zones. In the lower elevations, grow plants of the genera Stipa, Adesmia, Mulinum, Nassauvia, and Chuquiraga. At the highest elevations, grow Senecio, Nassauvia, Chaetanthera, Draba, Barneoudia, Leucheria, and Moschopsis.

Fauna
The fauna is similar to that of the Central Andean dry puna and the Patagonian steppe. Large mammals found here include the puma (Puma concolor), the Andean fox (Lycalopex culpaeus) and the vicuna (Vicugna vicugna) and guanaco (Lama guanicoe).

Contemporary land use
This ecoregion's high elevations and harsh climate make it unsuitable for development or farming, so it has experienced little habitat loss.

Protected areas
21.165% of the ecoregion is in protected areas. Protected areas include:
Abra del Acay Natural Monument
Caverna de las Brujas Nature Reserve
Cerro Aconcagua Provincial Park
El Leoncito National Park
El Morado Natural Monument
Laguna del Diamante Nature Reserve
Laguna del Laja National Park
Nevado Tres Cruces National Park
Puente del Inca Natural Monument
Río Clarillo National Reserve
Río de los Cipreses National Reserve
San Guillermo National Park
Volcán Tupungato Provincial Park
Yerba Loca Nature Sanctuary

References

Ecoregions of the Andes
Ecology of Patagonia
Montane grasslands and shrublands
Ecoregions of Argentina
Ecoregions of Chile

Grasslands of Argentina
Grasslands of Chile
Grasslands of South America
Neotropical ecoregions